Jeremy Thomas Andrew Benton (born 14 June 1995) is a New Zealand former cricketer. He made his Twenty20 debut for Canterbury on 4 December 2016 in the 2016–17 Super Smash. Prior to his debut, he was part of New Zealand's squad for the 2014 Under-19 Cricket World Cup. He made his List A debut for Canterbury in the 2017–18 Ford Trophy on 3 December 2017.

He played cricket in Ireland in 2018 and 2019, captaining the Munster Reds team.

References

External links
 

1995 births
Living people
New Zealand cricketers
Canterbury cricketers
Munster Reds cricketers
Sportspeople from Canterbury
New Zealand sportsmen